Signe Vessman (1879 - 1953) was a Swedish politician (Social Democrat).

She was born to the stonemason August Svensson and Maria Kristina Graaf. She married the bank clerk Johan Adolf Vessman (1877–1966) in 1914. Working as a seamstress, she became active in union work and engaged in the sociala democratic movement early on. 

She was the chairperson of the Women's Trade Union from 1906 to 1908, ombudsman in the Tailor's Union from 1909 to 1911; cashier for Morgonbris from 1911 to 1920 and its editor from 1920 to 1932. She was the chairperson of the Social Democratic Women in Sweden from 1920 to 1936, the Socialist Women's Committee from 1923 to 1936, and MP of the andra kammaren of the Riksdag from 1925 to 1928.

References

1879 births
1953 deaths
20th-century Swedish politicians
20th-century Swedish women politicians
Swedish social democrats
Swedish feminists